This list contains former names used by the Oregon Department of Transportation and predecessors for state highways. It includes former names for current state highways and roads that are no longer state highways.

 Adrian-Parma Highway
 Albany-Sisters Highway
 Alsea River Forest Road
 Ashland-Klamath Falls Highway
 Athena-Cold Springs Highway
 Baker-Cornucopia Highway
 Baker-Homestead Highway
 Baker-Unity Highway
 Banfield Expressway
 Beaverton-Aurora Highway
 Beech Creek Highway
 Bend-Sisters Highway
 Bertha-Beaverton Highway
 Boardman-Stanfield Highway
 Burns-Crane Highway
 Butteville Road-Hubbard Highway
 Canyon City-Burns Highway
 Canyon Road
 Cascade Highway (Oregon)
 Cascade Locks Highway
 Coast Highway (Oregon)
 Columbia River Highway West
 Corvallis-East Side Highway
 Crane-Scotts Butte Highway
 Crooked River-Paulina Highway
 Crown Point Highway
 Dallas-Coast Highway
 Dallas-Dolph Corner Highway
 Dallas-Kings Valley Highway
 Dillard Highway
 Drain-Yoncalla Highway
 East Diamond Lake Highway
 East Portland-Oregon City Highway
 Enterprise-Flora Highway
 Eugene-Florence Highway
 Eugene-Swisshome Highway
 Forest Grove-McMinnville Highway
 Fulton Canyon-Wasco Highway
 Grants Pass-Crescent City Highway
 Halfway Highway
 Hillsboro-Woodburn Highway
 Homedale Spur Highway
 Jordan Valley Highway
 Klamath Falls-Weed Highway
 Klamath-Crater Lake Highway
 La Grande-Enterprise Highway
 La Grande-Joseph Highway
 La Grande-North Powder Highway
 La Grande-Wallowa Lake Highway
 La Pine-Lakeview Highway
 Little Butte Highway
 Mapleton-Eugene Highway
 McDermitt-North Highway
 McKenzie River Highway
 McMinnville-Tillamook Highway
 Medford-Crater Lake Highway
 Medford-Provolt Highway
 Monument Highway
 Mount Hood Loop Highway
 Mount Hood-Clear Lake Highway
 Myrtle Creek Highway
 Nyssa-Adrian Highway
 Oakland-Shady Highway
 Old Columbia River Drive Highway
 Otter Rock Highway
 Portland-Salem Expressway
 Prineville-Bear Creek Highway
 Prineville-Lakeview Highway
 Richardson-Eugene Highway
 Rim Drive
 Robinette-Homestead Highway
 Rome-Princeton Highway
 Roosevelt Coast Highway
 Salem Freeway
 Salem-Dallas Highway
 Salem-Independence Highway
 Sandy Boulevard Highway
 Siuslaw Highway
 Springfield-Cottage Grove Highway
 Starkey Highway
 Sullivan Gulch Highway
 Sumpter Valley Highway
 Three Mile Lane Highway
 Tiller-Summit Forest Road
 Tiller-Trail Highway
 Umatilla Cutoff Highway
 West Portland-Hubbard Highway
 West Side Pacific Highway
 Willamette Valley-Florence Highway
 Williams Highway
 Wolf Creek Highway
 Woodburn-Mount Hood Loop Highway
 Woodburn-Sandy Highway
 Yamhill-Nestucca Highway
 Yellowstone Cut-off Highway

Named state highways in Oregon
Former numbered highways in the United States
Former